A leadership spill of the Australian Labor Party (ALP), then the opposition party in the Parliament of Australia, was held on 16 February 1956.

Background
Labor frontbencher Allan Fraser unsuccessfully challenged ALP leader H. V. Evatt. Fraser was a known maverick who thought Evatt unelectable, and was derisive of his handling of the Industrial Groups and the ensuing "split" in the Labor Party.

Evatt was re-elected comfortably by 58 votes to 20. Arthur Calwell was re-elected deputy leader, securing 42 votes against 20 for Eddie Ward and 14 for Les Haylen.

Results
The following table gives the ballot results:

See also
Australian Labor Party split of 1955
1955 Australian federal election

References

Australian Labor Party leadership spills
February 1956 events in Australia
1956 elections in Australia
Australian Labor Party leadership spill